is the sixth studio album by Lars Winnerbäck and the first by his band Hovet, released in 2003 through Universal Music. It has been certified platinum in Sweden.

Track listing

Charts

Weekly charts

Year-end charts

References 

2003 albums
Lars Winnerbäck albums